Rogier (Roger) Remaut (born Ostend, 17 August 1942) is a Belgian painter (material art). Using mixed media (acrylic), his works are constructions of material incorporating objects found, texture, layers of paint and graffiti. The paintings are built up slowly with many layers of matter and paint.

Education 
Roger Remaut studied art at the Ostend Academy under artists Gustaaf Sorel, Maurice Boel and Willy Bosschem. He then followed a course at the Westhoek Academy. As a painter he is an autodidact.

Career 
He had his first exhibition, together with his brother Pierre Remaut, in 1982 in Galerie de Pepperbusse in Ostend.

Selections in international competitions followed with shows in Belgium, the Netherlands, France, Luxemburg, Germany and the United Kingdom. His works hang in public and private collections including those of the Belgian national and local governments and the Museum of Fine Arts, Ostend.

Distinctions 

1982 Prize for painting, Harelbeke Belgium
1983 Hoppe Prize, Poperinge Belgium
1983 Work in the collection of Tuinbouwschool, Puurs, Belgium
1984 Gaver Prize, Waregem Belgium
1985 Prize for painting, Aarschot Belgium
1986 Work in the national collection of Belgium
1986 Work in the office of the Minister for Internal Affairs, Belgium
1990 Work in the Museum of Fine Art, Ostend.
1992 Ostend artists in Maastricht, the Netherlands
1992 Luxemburg City Art Centre Luxemburg
1995 Coleurs en Val Mosan, Huyl, Belgium
1996 Work in the Flemish government collection.
1998 Essex Open, GB
1998 Southwark Arts Association Open, London, GB
1998 Norwich Film & Multimedia Festival, GB
1999 Essex Open, GB
2005 International Assemblage Artist Exhibition, Berlin, Germany.

References 
 Book – Beeldend Oostende by Norbert Hostyn, curator Museum of Fine Art, Ostend 1993
 Art Bulletin Magazine, Éire, Article by Frank Decerf – A Glimpse of a Great Flemish Artist: Roger Remaut, 1994
 Book – Lexicon van West-Vlaamse Beeldende Kunstenaars 1996
 Book – 40 Oostendse Kunstenaars, Norbert Hostyn, Lowyck drukkerij, 2008
 Magazine – 2000 Jaar Middenkust & Hinterland, Waar is de Tijd, Norbert Hostyn, Uitgeverij Waanders, 2007.
Museum of Fine Art, Ostend – archive
Website http://user.skynet.be/remaut
 :nl:Gustaaf Sorel
 :nl:Roger Remaut
Gallery 24, Berlin, Germany http://www.assemblageart.de/Artists/Remaut_001.html

1942 births
Living people
Artists from Ostend
Belgian contemporary artists
Belgian painters